Cullman County is a county located in the north central portion of the U.S. state of Alabama. As of the 2020 census, the population was 87,866. Its county seat and largest city is Cullman. Its name is in honor of Colonel John G. Cullmann.

Cullman County comprises the Cullman, AL Micropolitan Statistical Area, which is a component of the Birmingham-Hoover-Talladega, AL Combined Statistical Area.

It is served by TV stations and FM radio stations from both Huntsville and Birmingham and is part of the designated market area, or "DMA," of Birmingham.   Cullman is a "moist" county in terms of availability of alcoholic beverages; the cities of Cullman, Good Hope, and Hanceville allow sale of alcohol and are "wet" and the rest of the county is dry.

History
This area was inhabited for thousands of years by varying cultures of indigenous peoples. The historic Cherokee and Choctaw lived here at the time of European encounter, with the Cherokee moving in after the American Revolutionary War and in response to pressures from northern areas. Their settlements in Alabama were known as the Lower Towns.

People claiming descent from Cherokee who remained in the county after Indian Removal in the 1830s, organized as the "Echota Cherokee Tribe of Alabama" in the 1980s. The tribe was recognized by the state in 1984 but is not federally recognized. It claims 22,000 members in the state, mostly in northern Alabama.

Cullman County was organized in 1877 primarily by German American immigrants who had moved down from Cincinnati, Ohio. They founded an agricultural community and sought to create an agricultural revolution in what had been a frontier area, in the best traditions of innovation in the New South. However, hard geographical and social realities clashed with the often impractical vision of colonizer John G. Cullmann. His Germans, with their traditional work ethic and willingness to experiment with such new products as wine and strawberries, tried to make practical changes in southern farming. The Germans were outnumbered by more traditional families from neighboring regions, who replicated the traditional southern cotton culture.

On April 27, 2011, Cullman was hit by an EF4 tornado from the 2011 Super Outbreak.

Geography

Adjacent counties
Morgan County (north)
Marshall County (northeast)
Blount County (east)
Walker County (southwest)
Winston County (west)
Lawrence County (northwest)

Transportation

Major highways

 Interstate 65
 U.S. Highway 31
 U.S. Highway 231
 U.S. Highway 278
 State Route 67
 State Route 69
 State Route 91
 State Route 157

Rail
CSX Transportation

Demographics

2000 census
As of the census of 2000, there were 77,483 people, 30,706 households, and 22,476 families living in the county.  The population density was 105 people per square mile (41/km2).  There were 35,233 housing units at an average density of 48 per square mile (18/km2).  The racial makeup of the county was 96.81% White, 0.96% Black or African American, 0.37% Native American, 0.18% Asian, 0.03% Pacific Islander, 0.62% from other races, and 1.03% from two or more races.  2.18% of the population were Hispanic or Latino of any race.

There were 30,706 households, out of which 32.10% had children under the age of 18 living with them, 60.80% were married couples living together, 8.70% had a female householder with no husband present, and 26.80% were non-families. 24.00% of all households were made up of individuals, and 10.40% had someone living alone who was 65 years of age or older.  The average household size was 2.49 and the average family size was 2.94.

In the county, the population was spread out, with 24.30% under the age of 18, 8.80% from 18 to 24, 28.30% from 25 to 44, 24.00% from 45 to 64, and 14.60% who were 65 years of age or older.  The median age was 38 years. For every 100 females, there were 97.30 males.  For every 100 females age 18 and over, there were 94.20 males.

The median income for a household in the county was $32,256, and the median income for a family was $39,341. Males had a median income of $30,444 versus $20,436 for females. The per capita income for the county was $16,922.  About 9.50% of families and 13.00% of the population were below the poverty line, including 14.50% of those under age 18 and 16.80% of those age 65 or over.

2010 census
As of the census of 2010, there were 80,406 people, 31,864 households, and 22,487 families living in the county. The population density was 109 people per square mile (42/km2). There were 37,054 housing units at an average density of 49 per square mile (18/km2). The racial makeup of the county was 94.7% White, 1.1% Black or African American, 0.5% Native American, 0.4% Asian, 0.0% Pacific Islander, 2.2% from other races, and 1.1% from two or more races. 4.3% of the population were Hispanic or Latino of any race.

There were 31,864 households, out of which 28.0% had children under the age of 18 living with them, 55.2% were married couples living together, 10.4% had a female householder with no husband present, and 29.4% were non-families. 25.7% of all households were made up of individuals, and 11.0% had someone living alone who was 65 years of age or older.  The average household size was 2.49 and the average family size was 2.98.

In the county, the population was spread out, with 23.2% under the age of 18, 8.6% from 18 to 24, 24.8% from 25 to 44, 27.5% from 45 to 64, and 15.9% who were 65 years of age or older.  The median age was 39.9 years. For every 100 females, there were 97.6 males.  For every 100 females age 18 and over, there were 100.9 males.

The median income for a household in the county was $38,567, and the median income for a family was $47,771. Males had a median income of $36,952 versus $27,979 for females. The per capita income for the county was $20,284. About 12.8% of families and 16.7% of the population were below the poverty line, including 21.6% of those under age 18 and 12.6% of those age 65 or over.

2020 census

As of the 2020 United States census, there were 87,866 people, 32,090 households, and 23,212 families residing in the county.

Education

Public education in Cullman County is provided by two systems: the Cullman City School Board and the Cullman County School Board, which governs all municipalities except the City of Cullman.
Cullman High School - under the governance of the Cullman City School Board

Private educational institutions in the county include:
Christ Covenant School - located in Cullman (Grades K-2)
Cullman Christian School - located in Cullman (Grades K-12)
Sacred Heart of Jesus Catholic Elementary School - located in Cullman (Grades PreK-6)
St. Bernard Preparatory School - located in Cullman (Grades 7-12)
St. Paul's Lutheran School - located in Cullman (Grades K-6)
Vinemont Christian Academy - located in South Vinemont (Grades PreK-12)

Cullman is also the home of Wallace State Community College in Hanceville. It was named for the former Governor of Alabama, George C. Wallace.  The public, non-profit college opened its doors in 1966 and has grown to become the third largest community college in the state of Alabama, with an enrollment of around 6,000 students. The college is accredited by the Southern Association of Colleges and Schools Commission on Colleges to award degrees. Many programs have additional accreditation from organizations appropriate to the particular disciplines. Wallace State offers hundreds of degree and certificate options in dozens of programs in its Academic, Health and Technical Divisions. The college offers more Health programs than any other community college in the state. The college offers early enrollment through its Dual Enrollment, Fast Track Academy and Fast Track for Industry programs, the latter of which is funded through grants that allow free tuition for qualified students entering the technical, academic and health programs included in the program. The college's current president is Dr. Vicki P. Karolewics, who is the institution's third president in 50 years. She was preceded by Dr. James C. Bailey from 1971 to 2003 and Dr. Ben Johnson from 1965 to 1971. The college is located in the southern portion of Cullman County. Athletic programs at Wallace State include men's and women's basketball, baseball, softball, men's and women's golf, men's and women's tennis, volleyball and cheerleading.

Government
Cullman County is overwhelmingly Republican at the presidential level. The last Democrat to win the county in a presidential election is Jimmy Carter, who won it by a slim majority in 1980 despite losing the state of Alabama to Ronald Reagan.

Communities

Cities
 Arab (mostly in Marshall County)
 Cullman (county seat)
 Good Hope
 Hanceville

Towns

 Baileyton
 Berlin
 Colony
 Dodge City
 Fairview
 Garden City (partly in Blount County)
 Holly Pond
 South Vinemont
 West Point

Census-designated places
 East Point
 Joppa (partly in Marshall County)

Unincorporated communities

 Arkadelphia
 Battleground
 Birdsong
 Black Bottom
 Bremen
 Brooklyn
 Bug Tussle
 Corinth
 Crane Hill
 Damascus
 Jones Chapel
 Logan
 Phelan
 Simcoe
 Spring Hill
 Trimble 
 Vinemont
 Walter
 Welti
 Wilburn
 White City

See also

National Register of Historic Places listings in Cullman County, Alabama
Properties on the Alabama Register of Landmarks and Heritage in Cullman County, Alabama

References

Notes

External links
 Cullman County
 Cullman Live Community Forum

Further reading
 Davis, Robert S., “The Old World in the New South: Entrepreneurial Ventures and the Agricultural History of Cullman County, Alabama,” Agricultural History, 79 (Fall 2005), 439–61.

 

 
1877 establishments in Alabama
Counties of Appalachia
Micropolitan areas of Alabama